The Elevador da Ribeira or Elevador da Lada is a public elevator in Porto, Portugal.

It was designed by the architect António Moura, and its inauguration on 13 April 1994 was attended by President Mário Soares and other dignitaries.

The lift is open from Monday to Friday from 08:00 to 20:00.

References

Buildings and structures in Porto
Transport infrastructure in Porto
Individual elevators
Transport infrastructure completed in 1994
1994 establishments in Portugal